Wendy Christensen is a fictional character in the Final Destination franchise. The character, created by James Wong and Glen Morgan, and portrayed by actress Mary Elizabeth Winstead, serves as the protagonist in Final Destination 3. Outside of the films, the character also appears in the novelization of Final Destination 3.

In the film, Wendy is depicted a high school graduate from the fictional town of McKinley in Pennsylvania, and is one of the survivors of the Devil's Flight roller coaster derailment. The character is portrayed in the film as an emotional, obsessive-compulsive "control freak" who becomes increasingly distressed over the course of the film as she fails to save the lives of those around her. Although her fate at the end of the film remains ambiguous, it's implied that she is the tenth and final survivor to die. Additionally, in 2011, franchise producer Craig Perry stated that he "believes" both Wendy and her sister Julie are, in fact, dead.

Both the character and Winstead's performance were positively received by critics, often being singled out as one of the highlights of the film, even by its detractors. The character's fate given the movie's ambiguous ending has also attracted discussion.

Appearances

Final Destination 3
Wendy lives in McKinley, Pennsylvania, with her sister Julie Christensen. She is shown to be a control freak. She is dating Jason Wise, and is friends with Kevin Fischer and Carrie Dreyer. She is the school photographer for the yearbook. Wendy and her friends celebrate at the amusement park for their senior field trip. At the start of the film, Wendy admits that she doesn't care for Kevin, but as the movie goes on she slowly forms a caring relationship with Kevin.

Before boarding a roller coaster ride known as "Devil's Flight", Wendy begins to have the feeling of "having no control". Shortly after being seated on the coaster, she suffers a premonition of the entire ride derailing and brutally killing her and all the other passengers. She panics, and manages to get several of her fellow students off, before realizing her boyfriend Jason and best friend Carrie are still on the roller coaster. She fails to get them off the ride in time and witnesses the derailment of the roller coaster and the death of Jason and Carrie.

After the incident, she is determined to leave McKinley due to the bad memories. When she begins noticing the photographs she took on the night of the roller coaster ride carry ominous clues as to how the other survivors eventually meet their end and also learns details of the Flight 180 disaster from Kevin beforehand, she then pairs up with him to save the other survivors; she ends up only managing to rescue Ian McKinley, her sister Julie, and Kevin from their second intended deaths. Shortly after, Ian confronts Wendy, Kevin, and Julie; he blames Wendy for his girlfriend Erin Ulmer's death and is determined to ensure that she will not survive. Fireworks behind Wendy nearly hit her, but she avoids them and thus escapes her second death. However, they hit a nearby cherry picker, and it collapses and kills Ian. Wendy, Kevin, and Julie believe they have managed to escape Death, but five months later, Wendy sees signs relating to the events of both the roller coaster and the Flight 180 disasters, and senses something is wrong. After unexpectedly reuniting with Julie and Kevin, she receives another premonition that foretells their deaths in a subway crash. Her attempts to stop the subway are for naught, as the film cuts to black, with sounds of the train derailment being heard just as she runs towards the exit door, leaving her fate ambiguous.

According to Winstead, the character is not dead: "I didn't die. Or rather, it's open to debate."

In January 2021, Screen Rant horror author Mara Bachman explored the possibilities of Wendy surviving. Bachman concluded her long analysis by saying that Wendy did not survive, and says that had she survived, she should be featured in the sixth installment, which she said is very unlikely, adding that Final Destination 5 completed the original movie timeline.

Alternate endings
Three alternate endings result in different fates for Wendy.

In the first alternate ending on the DVD, after Ian gets completely crushed, she along with Kevin and Julie leave the tricentennial, but not before the camera which Wendy threw to the ground takes one last picture of them, presumably hinting their next way of death. In another ending, Wendy did not receive the second premonition and the film ends with the subway barreling straight into her, explicitly showing her death. In the final alternate ending, Wendy receives her vision before she boards the roller coaster, and manages to save herself along with Kevin, Jason, and Carrie.

Final Destination 5
In the fifth installment of the Final Destination franchise, Wendy appears through archive footage.

Literature
Wendy appears in the novelization of Final Destination 3 by Christa Faust. The storyline follows the same one as the film but in the novel Wendy survives. In the novel, Wendy's relationship with Kevin, opposite to the film, turns sexual, when they are in the gym where Lewis Romero dies.

Casting and creation
In a DVD feature, James Wong revealed that he originally intended for Wendy to be a "perky blonde" and that Alexis Bledel had auditioned for the role. Winstead, who got cast in March 2005, had previously auditioned for the second film, won the role because she brought emotion and character that impressed Wong and Morgan. When asked if she was a fan of the Final Destination franchise prior to being cast in the third film, Winstead mentioned auditioning for the second film saying, "Definitely. I was a fan of both films. I auditioned for the second one, but didn’t make it. I was happy to get a shot here". Wong described Wendy as being "deeply affected by the accident, but she’s strong, and fights to maintain control."

Reception

Wendy has received a positive reception from critics. Winstead's performance was met with generally positive reception among critics. James Berardinelli says she "does as competent a job as one could expect in these dire circumstances." Felix Gonzalez, Jr. speaks positively of Winstead's and Merriman's performances, saying "the film is not entirely unwatchable. Mary Elizabeth Winstead and Ryan Merriman are likeable in the lead roles."

Frank Ochieng also calls Winstead a "passable leading lass" and TheDailyMacabre even goes on to say, "Winstead is a stronger lead than A. J. Cook".

Common Sense Media reacted positively to the character, saying that despite the movie not asking viewers to invest emotionally in the characters "you do invest, if only because of formula, in Wendy, who tries so hard to save her classmates."

Louis B. Hobson however criticizes her and Merriman's performances, saying "Merriman and Winstead have basically two emotions. They're either grieving or terrified." Waffle Movies adds "the performance is too much", likening her performance to "the person who shows up to a Halloween costume party wearing a formal evening gown."

See also
 Final girl

References

Fictional characters from Pennsylvania
Fictional characters with precognition
Film characters introduced in 2006
Final Destination characters
Final girls
Teenage characters in film